Suq Al Masgouf is an indoor market place in the centre of the city of Samawah in southern Iraq. Dating back to the Ottoman period, the area surrounding the Suq Al Masgouf is the old Byzantine city of other crowded markets and streets.

Buildings and structures in Iraq
Architecture in Iraq
Tourist attractions in Iraq
Souqs